Tim Conlon (born 1974 in Alexandria, Virginia) is an American artist and graffiti writer known for large-scale murals and works on canvas. He was featured as one of several artists (including Kehinde Wiley and poet, Nikki Giovanni) in the Smithsonian National Portrait Gallery exhibit, Recognize! Hip Hop and Contemporary Portraiture, which included four large graffiti murals painted by Conlon and collaborator, David Hupp in 2008. This marked the first modern graffiti ever to be in the Smithsonian Institution.

In 2011, he curated the G scale train exhibit in the Los Angeles Museum of Contemporary Art’s, Art in The Streets survey of graffiti and street art. His Blank Canvas train paintings are in multiple collections, including the Norfolk Southern Corporation's headquarters in Norfolk, Virginia. Conlon's art can be found on the streets of Washington, D.C. in city-sponsored public art projects. Conlon has exhibited at the Corcoran Gallery of Art, along with shows and projects in New York, Los Angeles, Miami, Chicago, San Francisco, London, Paris, Bordeaux and Berlin.

Exhibitions 
BEYOND THE STREETS NYC, 25 Kent, New York, NY (Group) 2019
BEYOND THE STREETS, Werkartz, Los Angeles, CA (Group) 2018
Moniker Art Fair, The Old Truman Building, London, UK (Group) 2017
Between the Lines, Roman Fine Art, East Hampton, NY 2017
Cruel Summer, Jonathan LeVine Gallery, New York City (Group) 2014
Transit, Vertical Gallery, Chicago (Group) 2014
One Track Mind, The Seventh Letter, Los Angeles 2014
Pump Me Up: D.C. Subculture of the 1980s, Corcoran Gallery of Art, Washington, DC (Group) 2013
Art in the Streets, Los Angeles Museum of Contemporary Art (LA MOCA), Los Angeles (Group) 2011
Sanrio's Small Gift, Miami (Group) 2010
The Underbelly Project, New York City (Group) 2010
les grandes Traversées, Cortex Athletico, Bordeaux (Group) 2010
Black in Black w/Mark Jenkins, The Fridge, Washington, DC (Split) 2010
Recycled Meaning: Oil and Water, Corcoran Gallery of Art, Washington, DC (Group) 2009
BOMBS AWAY!, Strychnin Gallery, Berlin (Curator/Group) 2009
MANIFESTHOPE:DC, The Manifest Hope: DC Gallery, Washington, DC (Group) 2009
Recognize! Hip Hop and Contemporary Portraiture, Smithsonian National Portrait Gallery, Washington, DC (Group) 2008
400ML Project, Maison des Métallos, Paris (Group) 2008

Bibliography 
 Gastman, Roger. BEYOND THE STREETS. May 2018. 
 LTD. Sanrio Company, and Roger Gastman. Hello Kitty, Hello Art! Abrams, October 2012. 
 Workhorse, PAC, and Haze. We Own the Night: The Art of the Underbelly Project. Rizzoli Books, February 2012. 
 Deitch, Jeffrey, Roger Gastman, and Aaron Rose. Art in the Streets. Skira Rizzoli, April 2011. 
 Gastman, Roger and Caleb Neelon. The History of American Graffiti. Harper Design, April 2011. 
 Boone, Jobyl A., Brandon Fortune, and Frank H. Goodyear, III. RECOGNIZE! Hip Hop and Contemporary Portraiture. Washington, DC: National Portrait Gallery, 2008. 
 Gastman, Roger, Darin Rowland, and Ian Sattler. Freight Train Graffiti. Harry N. Abrams, June 2006. 
 Gastman, Roger. Enamelized. R77 Publishing, June 2004.

References

External links 
Official website

1974 births
Living people
20th-century American painters
American male painters
21st-century American painters
21st-century American male artists
American graffiti artists
20th-century American male artists